Nowdeh-e Hajji Nabi (also Romanized as Nowdeh-e Ḩājjī Nabī; also known as Nowdeh and Nowdeh-e Ḩājnabī) is a village in Farmahin Rural District, in the Central District of Farahan County, Markazi Province, Iran. At the 2006 census, its population was 57, in 18 families.

References 

Populated places in Farahan County